Wayne Kaumualii Westlake (1947–1984) was a Hawaiian poet, journalist, activist and translator of Chinese and Japanese works.

Biography
Westlake was born in Lahaina, Maui, and grew up in Aina Haina, Oahu. He was of German and Hawaiian ancestry. He graduated from Punahou School in 1966 and went on to study at the University of Oregon. He was strongly interested in Chinese literature, poetry, and philosophy, especially Taoism, and soon began translating ancient texts. An enthusiastic autodidact, he dropped out of college in 1969 and continued to learn on his own.

Drafted for the Vietnam War in the 60's, Westlake flew home and locked himself in his room with his typewriter and no food or water for three days as a means of protest. He managed to evade the war and resumed his studies at the University of Hawaii at Manoa in 1972, working part-time as a janitor and eventually earning his B.A. in Chinese studies.

As a journalist, Westlake battled United States attempts to control Hawaii, and eventually became involved with the anti-bombing protests for Kahoolawe led by George Helm, publishing poems and editorials in the protesters' defense. In 1979, he discovered about 30 Hawaiian petroglyphs on Kahoolawe, which strengthened the case against the experimental bombings.

He continued to publish editorials, translations, and poetry until his car was hit by an allegedly drunk driver in 1984. He died soon after in Hilo Hospital. Westlake is best known for his free verse poetry, which reflects both his lighthearted Taoist-style views on life and his struggles with such issues as U.S.-Hawaiian conflicts and poverty. Mei-Li M. Siy and Richard Hamasaki gathered his published and unpublished materials and published over two hundred of his poems with the University of Hawaii Press in 2009 under the title "Westlake: Poems by Wayne Kaumualii Westlake."

Selected publications
Westlake: Poems by Wayne Kaumalii Westlake edited by Mei-Li M. Siy and Richard Hamasaki 2009
It's Okay If You Eat Lots of Rice 1979
Born Pidgin 1979
Kahoolawe—Chants, Legends, Poems, Stories by Children of Maui 1977

References

Sources
Westlake: Poems by Wayne Kaumalii Westlake edited by Mei-Li M. Siy and Richard Hamasaki 2009

1947 births
1984 deaths
Punahou School alumni